David Sherrod Brandon (born February 9, 1965) is a former professional American football player who played linebacker for 11 seasons for four teams in the National Football League (NFL).

His oldest son Xzavian Brandon was a wide receiver at Minnesota and New Mexico State.

His youngest son Solomon Brandon is currently a defensive end at Gardner-Webb University.

References

External links
Just Sports Stats

1965 births
Living people
American football linebackers
Atlanta Falcons players
Cleveland Browns players
Memphis Maniax players
Memphis Tigers football players
Players of American football from Memphis, Tennessee
San Diego Chargers players
Seattle Seahawks players